Julian Knowle (born 29 April 1974) is an Austrian former male professional tennis player. Being a born left-hander, Knowle was one of the few on the ATP Tour who played his forehand, backhand, and even volleys double-handed. He was Austria's most successful doubles player in history by reaching world no. 6 in the ATP doubles rankings in January 2008, before being matched by Jürgen Melzer, who reached no. 6 in September 2010, and overtaken by Alexander Peya, who reached no. 3 in August 2013.

Tennis career
Knowle was a successful player on the ATP Challenger Series, winning the Challenger tournaments in Kyoto (1999), Caracas (2001), Graz (2001), and Andrezieux (2002), and reaching the finals in Yokohama (2000), Bristol (2000), Besançon (2000), and Graz (2003). He also won several Futures tournaments. Knowle's best ATP singles ranking was world no. 86 in July 2002. His final appearance in the main draw of a singles tournament was in the Graz Challenger in 2005 where he reached the quarterfinals.

2004
Knowle reached his first of two Grand Slam finals at Wimbledon in 2004 with Nenad Zimonjić of Serbia. Eventually, the team was defeated in four sets by Jonas Björkman and Todd Woodbridge. The only Austrian to reach a final at Wimbledon before was Georg von Metaxa in doubles in 1938, where he too lost.

2005-2006
In 2005 Knowle teamed up with Czech Petr Pála for several months without being able to continue his successful run with Zimonjić. This changed when he formed a team with fellow Austrian player and left-hander Jürgen Melzer, joining him throughout most of 2005 and 2006. Together, they won two tournaments in doubles and reached another five finals.

2007
Following Melzer's hand injury in early 2007, Knowle found a new partner in Simon Aspelin of Sweden.

At the 2007 US Open, seeded tenth with Aspelin, Knowle achieved the greatest triumph of his career by winning the tournament, his first Grand Slam. In the first two rounds, they won over Kubot/Skoch and got a walkover over Calleri/Horna. They went on to upset eighth seeds Jonathan Erlich and Andy Ram (who would go on to win the 2008 Australian Open men's doubles) in the third round. In the quarterfinals, they shocked the top seeds Bob and Mike Bryan, having lost to them only weeks before. In the semifinals, they held off unseeded Julien Benneteau and Nicolas Mahut, 7–6(2), 1–6, 6–3, before winning the final 7–5, 6–4 over the ninth seeds, Pavel Vízner and Lukáš Dlouhý. They had previously won three tournaments together. This win put them into the no. 5 position in the ATP Doubles Race, and also gave Knowle his first top-10 ranking in doubles.

Knowle was the second of so-far four Austrian tennis players to win a Grand Slam tournament (the first in doubles). The first Austrian to win a Grand Slam tournament was Thomas Muster at the 1995 French Open; the third was Jürgen Melzer, who won the 2010 Wimbledon Championships – Men's doubles and later the 2011 US Open – Men's doubles with his German partner Philipp Petzschner as well as the 2011 Wimbledon Championships - Mixed doubles with his later wife Iveta Benešová; the fourth was Dominic Thiem, who won the 2020 US Open - Men's Singles tournament.

Their excellent first year as a team enabled Knowle and Aspelin to participate in the Tennis Masters Cup in Shanghai, China for the first time. They surprisingly made it all the way to the final, beating Pavel Vízner and Lukáš Dlouhý, Arnaud Clément and Michaël Llodra, and finally Martin Damm and Leander Paes, before eventually falling in straight sets to Mark Knowles and Daniel Nestor 2–6, 3–6.

Their first Masters Cup participation put the duo into the no. 3 spot of the ATP Doubles Race for the first time.

In December 2007, Knowle suffered acute hearing loss.

2008
Knowle and Aspelin were not able to continue their successful 2007 run, reaching five semifinals together in the 2008 season and reaching the third round of the French Open as their best Grand Slam result.

With Jürgen Melzer, Knowle participated at the 2008 Olympic Games in Beijing. They defeated the German duo of Nicolas Kiefer and Rainer Schüttler in three sets in the first round, before being knocked out of the tournament by Bob and Mike Bryan, 6–7(2), 4–6.

2009
Starting early 2009, Knowle formed a team with fellow Austrian Jürgen Melzer once more, though occasionally also teaming with other players. Knowle and Melzer enjoyed little success on the tour in the first half of 2009, before their performance improved significantly in the later weeks, winning titles in New Haven and Tokyo and reaching another final in Vienna. Their success came too late in the year for them to qualify for the Masters Cup.

2010
In 2010, Knowle played the first months of the year with Sweden's Robert Lindstedt. Together, they reached the doubles final in Marseille, where they lost in straight sets. Due to little success on the tour together, Knowle and Lindstedt parted ways, with Knowle teaming with Andy Ram from Israel. Their best performance came at the French Open, where they surprisingly reached the semifinals.

2011
Knowle's 2011 season was plagued by numerous injuries. Following a groin injury, he teamed up once more with Simon Aspelin, but they had little success. A torn muscle fascicle in April ended their partnership, forcing Knowle to pause for six weeks. His planned return to the tour failed, when a partially torn tendon prevented his participation in the French Open to defend his semifinal success from the previous year.

2012
After dropping out of the top 80 of doubles players in late 2011 for the first time in 10 years, Knowle slowly made his way back to the top 50 in 2012, teaming with several different partners, including Michael Kohlmann, Paul Hanley, František Čermák, and Filip Polášek. He reached the doubles final in Estoril with David Marrero and won the Kitzbühel tournament with Cermak, claiming his first title since Tokyo in 2009. He also reached the quarterfinals at Wimbledon with Daniele Bracciali, and did the same at the US Open with Polášek.

At the Malaysian Open in Kuala Lumpur, Knowle made a surprise return to singles competition, surviving three qualifying rounds (including a first-round bye) to become the oldest player to ever qualify for an ATP tournament at age 38. He lost in the first round to Albert Ramos in straight sets.

2013
In April, Knowle won the Grand Prix Hassan II in Casablanca with Filip Polášek, winning the final over the German team of Dustin Brown and Christopher Kas.

2020-2021
In November 2020, he accompanied Kevin Krawietz and Andreas Mies as a coach at the 2020 ATP Finals.

In February 2021, Knowle competed in the Australian Open, marking his first Grand Slam appearance since 2017. Knowle and Lloyd Harris lost in the first round to the pairing of Nick Kyrgios and Thanasi Kokkinakis.

His last ATP event was the 2021 French Open. He officially retired in November 2021.

Performance timelines

Singles

Doubles 

Current through the 2021 French Open.

ATP career finals

Doubles: 44 (19 titles, 25 runner-ups)

References

External links

 
 
 

1974 births
Living people
20th-century Austrian people
21st-century Austrian people
Austrian male tennis players
Olympic tennis players of Austria
Tennis players at the 2008 Summer Olympics
US Open (tennis) champions
People from Bregenz District
Grand Slam (tennis) champions in men's doubles
Sportspeople from Vorarlberg